Vikai Kelley (born 2 September 2002) is an English cricketer. He made his Twenty20 debut on 1 September 2020, for the Birmingham Bears in the 2020 t20 Blast. He moved into the Leicestershire academy prior to the 2022 season.

References

External links
 

2002 births
Living people
English cricketers
Warwickshire cricketers
Cricketers from Wolverhampton